Saint-Martin-d'Oydes (Languedocien: Sent Martin d'Òidas) is a commune in the Ariège department in southwestern France.

Population
Inhabitants of Saint-Martin-d'Oydes are called Saint-Martinains.

See also
Communes of the Ariège department

References

Communes of Ariège (department)
Ariège communes articles needing translation from French Wikipedia